The 2019–20 Kentucky Wildcats women's basketball team represents the University of Kentucky during the 2019–20 NCAA Division I women's basketball season. The Wildcats, led by thirteenth-year head coach Matthew Mitchell, play their home games at Memorial Coliseum and Rupp Arena and compete as members of the Southeastern Conference (SEC).

Preseason

SEC media poll
The SEC media poll was released on October 15, 2019.

Rankings

^Coaches' Poll did not release a second poll at the same time as the AP.

Roster

Schedule

|-
!colspan=9 style=| Exhibition

|-
!colspan=9 style=| Non-conference regular season

|-
!colspan=9 style=| SEC regular season

|-
!colspan=9 style=| SEC Tournament

References

Kentucky Wildcats women's basketball seasons
Kentucky
Kentucky Wildcats
Kentucky Wildcats